Doumea is a genus of loach catfishes native to Africa.

Species of Doumea have a rather large and tapered body, a pointed head, and a thin caudal peduncle. Thin bilateral osseous peaks are sometimes present on the back and the belly, and are the precursors series of osseous plates observed in the other kinds of Doumeinae. By the shape of the body, these fish are adapted to rapids.

Species 
There are currently 9 recognized species in this genus:
 Doumea angolensis Boulenger, 1906
 Doumea chappuisi Pellegrin, 1933
 Doumea gracila P. H. Skelton, 2007
 Doumea reidi Ferraris, P. H. Skelton & Vari, 2010
 Doumea sanaga P. H. Skelton, 2007
 Doumea skeltoni Ferraris & Vari, 2014 
 Doumea stilicauda Ferraris, P. H. Skelton & Vari, 2010
 Doumea thysi P. H. Skelton, 1989
 Doumea typica Sauvage, 1879

References

Amphiliidae
Catfish of Africa
Freshwater fish genera
Catfish genera
Taxa named by Henri Émile Sauvage